Plansky is a surname.  Notable people with the surname include:

 Mark Plansky (born 1966), American basketball player
 Tony Plansky (1900–1979), American football player